The Pittsburgh Stingers are a defunct indoor soccer team that played in the Continental Indoor Soccer League (CISL) for two seasons from 1994 to 1995.

Year-by-year

Players
 Bob Lilley (1994)
 P.J. Johns (1995)
 David Moxom (1995)
 Doug Petras (1994)
 Kia Zolgharnain (1994–95)
 Drago (1995): 29 Apps 24 Goals

References

Defunct indoor soccer clubs in the United States
Defunct Pittsburgh sports teams
Continental Indoor Soccer League teams
Soccer clubs in Pennsylvania
Association football clubs established in 1994
Association football clubs disestablished in 1995
1994 establishments in Pennsylvania
1995 disestablishments in Pennsylvania